Max Hirsch (30 December 1832 Halberstadt – 26 June 1905 Bad Homburg vor der Höhe) was a German political economist and politician.

Biography
He studied political economy and jurisprudence at the universities of Tübingen, Heidelberg, and Berlin, and then traveled through France and North Africa. As the result of his observations during these travels, he published: Skizze der volkswirtschaftlichen Zustände in Algerien (Sketch of socioeconomic conditions in Algeria, 1857), and Reise in das Innere von Algerien, durch die Kabylie und Sahara (A trip through the interior of Algeria, and through the Kabylie and Sahara, 1862). After a later journey through England and Scotland he returned home to organize trade unions among his countrymen. These soon spread all over Germany and, through them and their publication, Der Gewerkverein, he wielded great influence. He was several times a member of the Reichstag and was the leading spirit in a number of societies for the benefit of the laboring classes. His publications include: Was bezwecken die Gewerkvereine? (What are the aims of the labor unions?, 15th ed. 1891) and Das Invaliditäts- und Altersversicherungsgesetz (The law for invalids and the elderly, 3d ed. 1890).

Selected works
 Skizze der volkswirthschaftlichen Zustände von Algerien. Mit Rücksicht auf die deutsche Auswanderung. Georg H. Wigand, Göttingen 1857. Digitalisat
 Reise in das Innere von Algerien durch die Kabylie und Sahara. Grote, Hamm 1862. Digitalisat
 Die gegenseitigen Hülfskassen und die Gesetzgebung. Mit dem Gutachten über die Gesetzentwürfe des Reichskanzleramtes und den formulirten Gesetzentwürfen des Verfassers. Franz Dunker, Berlin 1875.
 Was bezwecken die Gewerkvereine? Ein Mahn- und Merkwort für alle deutschen Handwerker und Arbeiter. Selbstverlag des Verbandes der Deutschen Gewerkvereine, Berlin 1880. Digitalisat Staatsbibliothek Berlin (15. Auflage 1891)
 Die deutschen Gewerkvereine und ihr neuester Gegner. Zur Abwehr gegen die Angriffe des Herrn Prof. L. Brentano und zur Aufklärung über die Geschichte und Leistungen der Gewerkvereine. E. Staude, Berlin 1879.
 Die hauptsächlichen Streitfragen der Arbeiterbewegung. Steinitz & Fischer, Berlin 1886.
 Arbeiterschutz insbesondere Maximalarbeitstag vom Standpunkte der Deutschen Gewerkvereine. Walther & Apolant, Berlin 1890. Digitalisat FES
  Die Arbeiterschutz-Gesetzgebung. Leopold Freund, Breslau 1891. Digitalisat MDZ Reader
 Die Arbeiter-Bewegung und Organisation in Deutschland. Volks-Zeitung Verlag, Berlin 1892.
 Leitfaden mit Muster-Statuten für freie Hülfskassen. J. Heine Verlag, Berlin 1892. Humboldt Universität Berlin Digitalisat
 Die Arbeiterfrage und die Deutschen Gewerkvereine. Festschrift zum 25-jährigen Jubiläum der Deutscher Gewerkvereine (Hirsch-Duncker). C. L. Hirschfeld, Leipzig 1893. Digitalisat MDZ Reader
 Die Entwicklung der Arbeiterberufsvereine in Grossbritannien und Deutschland. Hermann Bahr, Berlin 1896 Digitalisat Internet Archive
 Thätigkeit und Entwicklung der Deutschen Gewerkvereine (Hirsch-Duncker) und ihres Verbandes. Bericht insbesondere für die Jahre 1898 bis 1901 erstattet auf dem 14. Verbandstage zu Köln a.Rh. am 27. Mai 1901. Berlin 1901.
 Volkshochschulen. Ihre Ziele, Organisation, Entwicklung, Propaganda. G. Reimer, Berlin 1901.
 Der gesetzliche Arbeiterschutz im Deutschen Reiche. Zusammengefügt und kurz erläutert. Verband der Deutschen Gewerkvereine, Berlin 1903.

Notes

References
 

1832 births
1905 deaths
People from Halberstadt
People from the Province of Saxony
Jewish German politicians
German Progress Party politicians
German Free-minded Party politicians
Members of the 3rd Reichstag of the German Empire
Members of the 5th Reichstag of the German Empire
Members of the 8th Reichstag of the German Empire
German economists
German Peace Society members
German activists
University of Tübingen alumni
Heidelberg University alumni
Humboldt University of Berlin alumni